Kollapur Assembly constituency is a constituency of Telangana Legislative Assembly, India. It is one of 4 constituencies in Nagarkurnool district. It is part of Nagarkurnool Lok Sabha constituency.

Beeram Harshavardhan Reddy who won Assembly elections held on 7 December 2018, is currently representing the constituency.

Mandals
The Assembly Constituency presently comprises the following Mandals:

Election results

Assembly election 2018

Assembly election 2014

See also
 List of constituencies of Telangana Legislative Assembly

References

Assembly constituencies of Telangana
Mahbubnagar district